Lophophelma calaurops is a moth of the family Geometridae first described by Louis Beethoven Prout in 1912. It is found in China (Hong Kong, Fujian, Hainan, Guangdong).

References

Pseudoterpnini
Moths of Asia
Moths described in 1912
Taxa named by Louis Beethoven Prout